Nunuk Ragang is a site traditionally considered as the location of the original home of the ancestors of the Kadazan-Dusun natives who inhabit most of northern Borneo.  The site, nearby a village named Tampias, is located at the intersection of the left (Liwagu Kogibangan) and right (Liwagu Kowananan) branches of the Liwagu River to the east of Ranau and Tambunan in Sabah. The two river branches joined up to flow into the Labuk river and drain out into the Sulu Sea. At the site, and under a giant banyan tree, a settlement referred to as Nunuk Ragang was founded.  The giant banyan tree was said to be able to give shade to a longhouse sheltering 10 families in it. The legend about Nunuk Ragang had been passed down via oral traditions to the younger generations. No archaeological dig has been carried out to establish the veracity of the legend.

In 2004, the quasi-government group Kadazan-Dusun Cultural Association (KDCA) set up a memorial near Tampias at the site of what they believed to be the original village. The word "tampias" means "sprinkled" or "dispersed".  The memorial was built in the form of a huge fig tree.  The association conducts annual pilgrimages to the site, timed to coincide with the inauguration of its paramount chief, the Huguon Siou.

Etymology
The name Nunuk Ragang is derived from two Kadazan-Dusun words "nunuk" which refers to the "banyan" tree and "ragang" which could mean "newborn baby" or is a shortened form of the word "aragang" which means "red colored". The two words together therefore possibly refer to either a "newborn baby banyan tree" or a "red coloured banyan tree".  Zoologically, there is no known banyan tree with red leaves or trunk. This fact has contributed to the mystery surrounding Nunuk Ragang but the most logical reason for naming the settlement as "red banyan" is that the settlers, in their attempt to attract attention to their presence, intentionally made the banyan tree to appear red. The Kadazan-Dusun has a fondness for riddling, giving names to places, things and actions in terms other than the actual.

Religious and cultural life
At the Nunuk Ragang settlement began the belief system and culture of the Kadazan-Dusun. There was no word for "religion" among the ancient Kadazan-Dusun and to them it was just a sort of relationship between the seen and the unseen. Some people would equate this to Animism. This belief system centers largely on their livelihood and rituals so as to maintain the balance, order and harmony between themselves and between them and their environment, which consequently provide conditions for bountiful cultivation and harvests and continued existence of the race. At the settlement also began Momolianism, a philosophical system, which when coupled with the belief system, had guided the life of the Kadazan-Dusun people up to the present age. Surrounded by thick primary forest teeming in wildlife, nature and nurture became the foundation for the birth and growth of thee belief system and cultural heritage of the Kadazan-Dusun.

Food and material needs
The Dusunic-speaking peoples, descendants of the pioneers at Nunuk Ragang, are today agriculturalists and paddy planting is the common occupation among them. But according to oral traditions passed down from elders, the Nunuk Ragang people were practising vegeculture. Vegeculture is the cultivation and propagation of plant food by utilising the suckers of plants such as the yam, the sweet potato and cassava, eliminating the needs for seeds and permanent storage thus facilitating rapid migrations. Bamboo and Rattan were the primary materials used for all forms of activities connected to home construction and storage. To light a fire the settlers used dried cottony bark scraped from the Polod palm tree. Metal, used for making dangol (short machete) and pais (carving knives) was already available, most probably through barter trading with coastal peoples. The Nunuk Ragang settlers also adapted to their environment by becoming hunter-gatherers and trappers. Salt, an important food enhancer and preservative was only intermittently available from the distant coastal region, prompting the Nunuk Ragang settlers to search out for sosopon (natural salt lick) frequented by wild animals. This persistent shortage of salt also gave rise to two important techniques, "memangi" and "manalau", for the preservation of meat and fish. Memangi produces "pinongian" or "bosou" (meat or fish preserved using the fleshy kernels from seeds of the Pangium Edule tree),  and manalau, a smoked meat called "sinalau".

Leadership and social hierarchy
The Huguan Siou leadership, a unique position to defend the culture, rights, identity and dignity of the Kadazan-Dusun was non existent at Nunuk Ragang. This leadership position, which had its roots at Guunsing, Penampang was only institutionalised after the formation of Malaysia in 1963. Although the Nunuk Ragang society was egalitarian, at times of challenge or crisis they were led by warriors, who in turn were guided by the words of Bobolians, as revealed by divine revelation from spirits. These bobolians were mostly women who play their role as priestesses. Women thus play an important function in the early Nunuk Ragang society.

Convergence
The possibility of further pinpointing the exact origin of the Kadazan-Dusun from before the Nunuk Ragang settlement was further enlightened during the official visit of Taiwan's minister of Council of indigenous People's, Icayang Parod in early June 2017. Masidi Manjun, Sabah minister of Tourism, Culture and Environment, referred to the numerous similarities particularly in ethnic languages between the indigenous peoples of Taiwan and the Kadazan-Dusun.

References

 Rutter, Owen. (1922). British North Borneo: An Account of its History, Resources and Native tribes. London: Constable and Company Limited. pp. 56–65
 Gidah, Mary Ellen (2001). Archetypes in the Cosmogonic Myths of the Australian Aboriginal People and the Kadazandusuns of Sabah. Kota Kinabalu: Universiti Malaysia Sabah Press. 
 Berinai, Judy (2013). Liturgical Inculturation in Anglican Worship in Light of the Spirituality of the Indigenous people of Sabah. Oxford Centre for Mission Studies, Oxford. p. 62-67
 Monica Glyn-Jones (1953). The Dusun of the Penampang Plains, 2 vols. London, p. 117.
 I. H. N. Evans, (1953) The Religion of the Tempasuk Dusuns of North Borneo Cambridge: Cambridge University Press, pp. 187–88; 
 Benedict Topin, (n.d.) "The Origin of the Kadazan/Dusun: Popular Theories and Legendary Tales" in Our Cultural Heritage, Kadazan Cultural Association, pp. 73–77.
 http://www.pensabah.gov.my/SETIA/artikel/lagenda_nunuk_ragang.htm The Legend of Nunuk Ragang in Malay.
 Nunuk Ragang and the Mystical Origin of the People of Sabah accessed 30 April 2006.
 Allan Dumbong, "Empowerment of Kadazandusun Youths in Nunuk Ragang" (2007)

History of Sabah
Malaysian legends
Sabahan culture
Sabah mythology
Malaysian mythology
Tourist attractions in Sabah